Roger is a masculine given name and a surname; please see that article for all people and animals, real or fictional, with that name. 

Roger may also refer to:

 Roger (radio communications), a word used in radiotelephony procedures to mean "message received"
 Roger (automobile), a 1920s car
 Roger (TV series), a Pakistan TV show

See also
Rogers (disambiguation)
Rodger, a surname and given name
 King Roger, 1926 Polish opera